High Society Calypso is a song written by Cole Porter for the 1956 American movie High Society. It was performed by Louis Armstrong and his band of Edmond Hall on the clarinet, Trummy Young on the trombone, Billy Kyle on the piano, Arvell Shaw playing the bass and Barrett Deems as the drummer.

Songs from High Society (1956 film)
Songs written by Cole Porter
Louis Armstrong songs